The Malaise of Modernity is a book by the Canadian philosopher Charles Taylor based on his 1991 Massey Lecture of the same title. Originally published by House of Anansi Press, it was republished by Harvard University Press with the title The Ethics of Authenticity.

See also 
 Authenticity (philosophy)
 The Closing of the American Mind
 The Culture of Narcissism
 Modernity
 Sources of the Self

References

External links 
 "The Malaise of Modernity" – Massey Lecture

1991 non-fiction books
Canadian non-fiction books
Ethics books
Harvard University Press books
House of Anansi Press books
Massey Lectures books